The following is the list of the denotified tribes of Tamil Nadu, India.

Ambalakarar (Thanjavur, Nagapattinam, Tiruvarur, Tiruchirapalli, Karur, Perambalur, Sivaganga, Virudunagar and Pudukottai Districts)
Kallar (Sivaganga, Virudhunagar, Ramanathapuram, Madurai, Theni, Dindigul, Pudukottai, Thanjavur, Nagapattinam, Tiruvarur, Kanchipuram Districts)
Kaladi (Sivaganga, Virudhunagar, Ramanathapuram, Madurai, Theni, Dindigul, Thanjavur, Nagapattinam, Thiruvarur, Pudukottai, Tiruchirapalli, Karur and Perambalur Districts)
Koravar (Madurai, Theni, Tiruchirapalli, Dindigul, Ramanathapuram, Thirunelaveli, Nagapattinam, Sivaganga, Salem, Dharmapuri, Namakkal, Erode, Coimbatore, Tirupur, Karur, Perambalur, Viruthunagar, Nagapattinam, Tiruvarur, Thiruvannamalai Districts)
Maravar (Karur, Thanjavur, Nagapattinam, Tiruvarur, Pudukottai, Ramanathapuram, Sivaganga, Virudhunagar, Tirunelveli, Thoothukudi, Madurai Districts)
Punnan Vettuva Gounder (Tiruchirapalli, Karur, Perambalur and Pudukottai Districts)
Telungapattti Chettis (Karur, Madurai, Perambalur and Pudukottai Districts)
Thottia Naicker (Sivaganga, Virudunagar, Ramanathapuram, Kancheepuram, Tiruvallur, Thanjavur, Nagapattinam, Tiruvarur, Tiruchirapalli, Karur, Perambalur, Pudukottai, Tirunelveli, Thoothukudi, Salem Districts)
Urali Gounder (Tiruchirapalli, Karur, Perambalur and Pudukottai Districts)
Valayars (Madurai, Theni, Dindigul, Tiruchirapalli, Karur, Perambalur, Pudukottai, Sivaganga, Virudunagar, Erode and Coimbatore Districts)
Vettaikarar (Thanjavur, Nagapattinam, Tiruvarur, Pudukottai, Thiruvannamalai, Salem, Namakkal Districts)
Vettuva Gounder (Tiruchirapalli, Karur, Perambalur and Pudukottai Districts)

External links
 List of Communities TNPSC
 List of Denotified Communities (DNC) of Tamil Nadu

Ethnic groups in India